Cimitra is a genus of moths belonging to the family of Tineidae.  Most species of this genus are found in Africa but Cimitra sechusella  Walker, 1864 is found in Southeast Asia.

Species
Species of this genus are:
Cimitra efformata (Gozmány, 1965)
Cimitra estimata (Gozmány, 1965)
Cimitra fetialis (Meyrick, 1917)
Cimitra horridella (Walker, 1863)
Cimitra platyloxa (Meyrick, 1930)
Cimitra spinignatha (Gozmány, 1968)
Cimitra sechusella  Walker, 1864
Cimitra texturata (Gozmány, 1967)

References

Tineidae
Tineidae genera